Colombia is a country in northwestern South America.

Colombia may also refer to:

Former nations
 Gran Colombia, a former nation, officially the Republic of Colombia, 1819–31
 United States of Colombia, a former name for Colombia, 1863–86

Cities, towns, and communities
 Colômbia, a city in São Paulo, Brazil
 Colombia, Cuba, a municipality in Las Tunas, Cuba
 Colombia, Huila, a city and municipality in Colombia
 Colombia, Nuevo León, a planned community in Mexico

Other uses 
 Colombia (Madrid Metro), a station on Line 8 and 9
 Miss Colombia (disambiguation), a beauty pageant title

See also

 Columbia (disambiguation)
 
 
 Colombian (disambiguation)
 Colombiana (disambiguation)
 Colombo (disambiguation)
 Columbian (disambiguation)
 Columbiana (disambiguation)
 Columbus (disambiguation)